The Canton of Vierzon-1 is a canton situated in the Cher département and in the Centre-Val de Loire region of France. It covers the northern part of the commune of Vierzon.

Geography
An urban and light industrial area at the confluence of the Yèvre and Cher rivers, in the centre of the arrondissement of Vierzon. The altitude varies from 94m to 182m, with an average altitude of 122m.

See also
 Arrondissements of the Cher department
 Cantons of the Cher department
 Communes of the Cher department

References

Vierzon-1